The Bicentenary Medal is a scientific award given by the Linnean Society.  It is awarded annually in recognition of work done by a biologist under the age of 40 years.  The medal was first awarded in 1978 on the 200th anniversary of the death of Carl Linnaeus.

Recipients 
Source (1990 to present): Linnean Society

See also
 List of biology awards

References

Biology awards
Linnean Society of London
British science and technology awards
Awards established in 1978
1978 establishments in England